"Do Ya" is a song written and recorded by American country music artist K. T. Oslin.  It was released in August 1987 as the third single from the album 80's Ladies.  The song was Oslin's third country hit and the first of four singles to hit number one on the country chart.  The single went to number one for one week and spent a total of sixteen weeks on the country chart.

Charts

References

1987 singles
K. T. Oslin songs
Song recordings produced by Harold Shedd
RCA Records Nashville singles
Songs written by K. T. Oslin
1987 songs